Matt Amato is an American film writer and director. His major works include music videos for artists such as Barbra Streisand, Beach House, Bon Iver, Dido, Edward Sharpe and the Magnetic Zeros, Soko, and Wild Nothing. He also co-founded the Los Angeles based visual arts collective, The Masses. In 2020, he completed his debut feature, Never My Love. Amato is now documenting the efforts of historic preservationist Larry Giles at the National Building Arts Center. Amato's music video for Trixie Mattel and Shakey Graves was released in 2022. Amato directed the "pastoral" music video for legendary country-folk musicians and gay activists, Lavender Country, filming in Olympic National Park.  Amato directed his third video for Barbra Streisand released by Columbia Records on October 7, 2022.

Early life and education 

Amato grew up in St. Louis, MO and was educated by the Benedictine monks at St. Louis Priory. He briefly attended film school at Columbia College in Chicago before venturing to California.

San Francisco (1990s) 
Amato began his directing career in the mid-1990s while living in San Francisco. Shooting on 16mm, he created music videos for San Francisco's American Music Club, Red House Painters and Tarnation. Amato’s videos were broadcast on MTV shows such as 120 Minutes and Subterranean. Experimenting with 8mm for the band Tipsy, Amato’s work aired on MTV’s electronic-music based, Amp. Amato continued to make progress at Palm Pictures with a video for Tijuana's Nortec Collective and live visual presentations for Supreme Beings Of Leisure.

Los Angeles + The Masses (2000s) 

Amato sustained his work in music videos by embracing digital film-making. In 2006, Amato established a partnership with his best friend, Heath Ledger. Amato told the Los Angeles Times in 2009, What Heath brought to us at the Masses was his pure creative energy, chessboards and surfboards.  The Masses started developing their own movie projects.  During this time, Ledger also developed the screenplay with Amato for what would be Amato's first movie, Never My Love.  “I was very well aware of the movies Heath wanted to make, because we shared the same values,” Amato reflects.  We definitely wanted to make movies for smart women. I think he had his daughter in mind, as well. We hated violence in our culture. We’re very against it. We wanted to flip that paradigm and focus on women and love, and chess.  Amato was on location in Eau Claire, WI directing Bon Iver’s first video the day Ledger died. “It was no longer about just making a Bon Iver music video anymore,” the group’s singer-songwriter Justin Vernon says. “This was now our chance to be there with Matt as he grieved. It was a three-day wake."

The Masses 2.0 (2010s) 

Amato joined forces with Executive Producer Jack Richardson in what was essentially the Masses 2.0.  The Masses functioned as a directors agency representing music video directors in Los Angeles: Ben Fee, Ben Kutsko, Chris Coats, Alistair Legrand, Isaiah Seret, Elliot Sellers, Raúl Fernández, Eli Stonberg, Alex Pelly to name just a few.  The Masses also assisted in the creation of OMG! Cameras Everywhere!, a music video making summer camp for young people in Los Angeles, London and NYC.  Amato's "gorgeous, incredibly cinematic" videos are known for their intimacy, spontaneity and sense of place often filming on location.  Amato says, It's about connecting with people. I've had some great opportunities to connect in a very personal way with some of the artists I worked with on music videos. There is that sense of nostalgia, even while you're there, on some music videos. I'm thinking particularly of the family I stayed with in Scotland when I did the Withered Hand video. Or working with Justin out in the woods during the Bon Iver video. Those are very powerful memories for me.  For Barbra Streisand's Release Me, "While Streisand had recorded the unreleased song in 1970, Amato did not direct the video until 2012. Consequently, he had to jog the memories of the original producer, Richard Perry, about important details of the original recording. Amato reproduced small details such as the original type of microphone preferred by Streisand and the setting of the recording. Amato describes it as “an exercise in verisimilitude.”  Amato invited "Kodachrome-drenched journeying" actress Michelle Williams to work with him on a "wistful" and "visually arresting" music video for Wild Nothing's Paradise.  Amato "comely grasps the elusive feeling of the song" and captures "Williams’ especially moving and elegant performance that elevates the video to absolute emotional harmony."

I Am Heath Ledger (2017) 

Amato signed on as an Executive Producer and creative consultant on the documentary film, I Am Heath Ledger.  He traveled to Perth, Australia to work with Ledger's family and to insure it would be a magnanimous sketch of his friend and partner.  It premiered at the Tribeca Film Festival with a Q+A involving Amato and Ledger's sisters, Ashleigh Bell and Kate Ledger. The "uncommonly tender" documentary is heralded for its sensitivity while reflecting on the actor's artistic nature as told by his most faithful friends and loved ones.  "I Am Heath Ledger is a cinematic portrait of Ledger the artist. Devoid of gossip and any hint of salaciousness," one reviewer noted.  "The result is refreshing, insightful, and also devastatingly sad."  It currently holds an 86% on Rotten Tomatoes. "I'll always have my reservations with the final product. But, overall, it's a very positive portrait of a real lover of life, and his family truly loves it. Their appreciation of it means a lot to me and made it worth doing.”  Amato told MTV News. “And I felt like there needed to be an anecdote to all of the gossip that's out there.”I don’t need to defend Heath or tell people how you should feel about Heath because you already have a feeling about Heath. He did his job beautifully. He was a communicator. He reached people, and that was his art.

Never My Love (2020) 

In the summer of 2013, Amato returned to his hometown of St. Louis to write and direct his debut feature, Never My Love, (aka The Makings Of You) starring Sheryl Lee, Grace Zabriskie and Jay R. Ferguson.  After resolving legal issues concerning an investor,  Amato completed the movie as it was intended in 2020 and is looking forward to its official release.  An early cut of the movie garnered some glowing reviews; this one from The Hollywood Reporter:   This beautifully acted and photographed drama leaves a lasting impression.  Amato, a veteran helmer of music videos, invests the proceedings with a subtle, dreamlike quality that gives the film an undeniable, but never stultifying, artsy feel. If you're not already in love when you see the film, you'll desperately want to be afterwards.

VJ Shows + Exhibitions + Screenings

Music videos

References

External links 
 Website
 Instagram

American film producers
1967 births
Living people
American music video directors